Hydrelia aurantiaca is a moth in the family Geometridae first described by George Hampson in 1903. It is found in China and Nepal.

References

Moths described in 1903
Asthenini
Moths of Asia